Peter Burggraaff (born 16 March 1971, in 's-Hertogenbosch) is a sailor from the Netherlands, who represented his country at the 1992 Summer Olympics in Barcelona. Burgraaff as crew in the Dutch Soling with Roy Heiner as helmsman and Han Bergsma as fellow crew Burggraaff took 18th place.

Professional life
 Business consultant: CapGemini (1996–1999)
 Managing partner: Tam Tam (2000–2002)
 Chief Information Officer: Farmers' Trading Company (2003–2006)
 IT outsource Program Director: HCL Technologies (2007)
 Director: The Boston Consulting Group (2008 – Present)

Further reading

1992 Olympics (Barcelona)

References

Living people
1971 births
Sportspeople from 's-Hertogenbosch
Dutch male sailors (sport)
Sailors at the 1992 Summer Olympics – Soling
Olympic sailors of the Netherlands
Chief information officers